House of Fraser (also operating as Frasers) is a British department store group with 44 locations across the United Kingdom, which is now part of Frasers Group. It was established in Glasgow, Scotland in 1849 as Arthur and Fraser. By 1891, it was known as Fraser & Sons. The company grew steadily during the early 20th century, and after the Second World War a large number of acquisitions transformed the company into a national chain.

From 1936, the company expanded substantially through acquisitions, including Scottish Drapery Corporation (1952), Binns (1953), Barkers of Kensington (1957), Dickins & Jones and the Harrods group (1959), and J J Allen and Colson's (1969). In 1948, the company was first listed on the London Stock Exchange. Later acquisitions included Howells (1972) and Army & Navy Stores (1973).

The group was purchased by the Al Fayed family in 1985 for £615million, beating out Tiny Rowland for control. By 1993, the management of the group were making attempts to purchase the group from the Al Fayeds, and a floatation was agreed, with the group initially trading separately as House of Fraser Holdings with the Fayed group.

The public float happened in 1995, when it was listed in the FTSE Index as House of Fraser plc, with Harrods moved into the private ownership of the Al Fayeds. 

In the 1990s, several stores were closed and fifteen stores transferred to a joint venture with British Land Company, which then continued operating under their old name. The former Harrods group store D H Evans on Oxford Street, London was re-branded as House of Fraser in 2001 and became the chain's flagship store.

In 2005, the group acquired Jenners (£46m), and Beatties (£69m). In 2006, the firm was acquired by a consortium of investors (Highland Group Holdings) including Icelandic based Landsbanki (35%). An online store was launched in 2007. In 2014, the group (as Highland Group Holdings Ltd) was sold to Nanjing Xinjiekou Department Store Co. (Sanpower Group), a leading chain of Chinese department stores for approximately £450 million. In May 2018, the group entered a company voluntary arrangement, and in June the closure of 31 stores was announced. On 10 August 2018, Mike Ashley's Sports Direct chain agreed to buy the business (stores, stock, brand) for £90 million after the chain went into administration earlier that day.

In 2021, a new spin-off of the House of Fraser brand opened in Wolverhampton's Mander Centre named Frasers. It was a first of its kind in the country, and its products are mostly high-end designer brands. The store features other Frasers Group brands Sports Direct, Evans Cycles, GAME and Flannels. Several other House of Fraser stores have been converted to the Frasers format since the opening of its Wolverhampton flagship.

History

The early years
The company was founded by Hugh Fraser and James Arthur in 1849 as a small drapery shop on the corner of Argyle Street and Buchanan Street in Glasgow, Scotland trading as Arthur and Fraser. Hugh Fraser had been apprenticed to Stewart & McDonald Ltd, a Glasgow drapery warehouse where he eventually rose to the position of warehouse manager. It was from here that he brought many of his new company's initial customers. James Arthur also owned a retail drapery business in Paisley, a Greater Glasgow suburb: he appointed a manager to oversee the Paisley business while he focused on his new business.

The company established a wholesale trade in adjoining premises in Argyle Street. In 1856 the wholesale business moved to a larger site in Miller Street, Glasgow, and started to trade under the name Arthur & Co. The retail side of the business expanded into the vacant buildings left by the wholesale side.

During the late 1850s and early 1860s, the retail business was run by a professional manager – first Thomas Kirkpatrick and then Alexander McLaren. In 1865 the partnership between the partners was dissolved and Fraser assumed control of the retail business leaving Arthur with the wholesale business. In 1865 McLaren joined the retail business and the name was changed to Fraser & McLaren.

Fraser & Sons
When the first Hugh Fraser died in 1873, his three eldest sons, James, John and Hugh, acquired stakes in the business. James and John Fraser were initially directors in the business and employed Alexander McLaren and later John Towers to manage it for them. In 1891 Hugh also joined the partnership which by then was called Fraser & Sons.

In 1879, the current flagship store on Oxford Street in London was opened by Dan Harries Evans, a 23-year-old from Whitemill in Carmarthenshire, Wales who had previously been apprenticed to a draper in Forest Hamlet near Merthyr Tydfil, Wales. He moved to London in 1878 to set up his own business in Westminster Bridge Road. The store traded under the D H Evans name until 2001.

By 1900, Hugh Fraser II was in charge: he incorporated the business as Fraser & Sons Ltd in 1909 and introduced the famous stag's head motif.

After Hugh Fraser II died in 1927, his son Hugh Fraser III, an accountant, became Chairman of the business. He opened new departments, enlarged the tearoom, opened a restaurant and also began to look at possible acquisitions. In 1936 he purchased Arnott & Co Ltd and its neighbour Robert Simpson & Sons Ltd in nearby Argyle Street, merging the companies to help improve trade. In 1948 the company, now named House of Fraser, was first listed on the London Stock Exchange.

1950s to 1970s

In 1951, the Company purchased McDonald's Ltd, and with it a branch in Harrogate. Fraser then purchased the Scottish Drapery Corporation in 1952, followed by the Sunderland based Binns group of stores in 1953.

Fraser sold the property sites to insurance companies, leasing them back for long terms at advantageous rates. This enabled the release of capital for the purchase of new premises and the modernisation of existing stores. In 1957, the Kensington store group of John Barker & Co Ltd was acquired and in 1959 Harrods and Dickins & Jones also joined the Group.

Sir Hugh Fraser succeeded his father as Chairman of the company when his father died in 1966. Sir Hugh resumed the expansion of the company in 1969 with the takeover of J. J. Allen Ltd, a Bournemouth based group, also including Colson's of Exeter and Brights of Bristol and Bournemouth.

During the 1970s, the House of Fraser Group acquired more companies including T. Baird & Sons Ltd of Scotland, Switzer & Co. Ltd of Dublin, Ireland, and E. Dingle & Co. Ltd, Chiesmans Ltd, Hide & Co and the Army & Navy Stores in southern England, as well as a number of independent stores, totaling over fifty stores during the decade. In 1973, the House of Fraser Group was considering merging with the British pharmacy company Boots, and was even subject to a written answer in the House of Commons. The government decided to block the proposed merger in 1974.

1980–1985

In 1981, Prof. Roland Smith succeeded Sir Hugh Fraser as chairman. A takeover bid by Lonrho was referred to the Monopolies and Mergers Commission and declared to be contrary to the public interest. Four new stores opened between 1980 and 1984, including D H Evans in Wood Green, North London in 1980, Dickins & Jones in Milton Keynes in 1981, Frasers in Perth in April 1984, and Army & Navy in Epsom, Surrey in May 1984.

The company, by then House of Fraser PLC, diversified into sports goods under the name of Astral Sports and Leisure (subsequently sold to Sears plc, owned Olympus Sport division) and into funerals with Wylie & Lochhead. It also launched the 'You' range of cosmetics and jewellery shops, and in 1985 acquired Turnbull & Asser Holdings Ltd, shirt makers of Jermyn Street, London and Kurt Geiger Holdings Ltd, shoe retailers. Other developments during the 1980s included the introduction of "Lifestyle" merchandise ranges and a huge investment in store refurbishment nationwide. In 1983 the Company introduced the Frasercard (later renamed Recognition), valid at all stores, and administered from a central facility based in Swindon.

1985–2006: Al Fayed ownership
In 1985, the Al Fayed family bought the business for £615 million. The Al Fayeds supported the continuing expansion of the company and replaced the stag's head logo with a stag leaping from a green triangle with shop signs of this period using a double-layered sans-serif typeface. In 1988, a five-year strategic business plan was announced which saw a rationalisation of stores. Small branches were to be relinquished and replaced with larger units.

In September 1990, two new department stores were opened, a House of Fraser in the Meadowhall Shopping Centre in Sheffield, and Schofields in Leeds. In 1991, a new House of Fraser store was opened at the Lakeside Shopping Centre in West Thurrock, Essex.

In 1994, before House of Fraser PLC was relisted on the London Stock Exchange, Harrods was moved out of the Group so that it could remain under the private ownership of the Al Fayed family. John Coleman, who was appointed chief executive of the House of Fraser Group in 1996, launched the Linea brand in 1997, along with Platinum and Fraser the following year. The House of Fraser logo was revised in 1996 with the leaping stag now going over an "F" shadow and shop signs using a serif typeface. There were many store closures in this period which included the closure or selling off of branches in locations including Sheffield (House of Fraser), Newcastle (Binns), Sunderland (Binns), Bradford (Rackhams) and Leeds (Schofields which had closed only six years after opening although House of Fraser continued to have a presence with their Rackhams (now House of Fraser store) in the city) with the loss of around 1,000 jobs.

House of Fraser set up BL Fraser, a 50–50 joint venture with the British Land Company, in 1999 to buy 15 House of Fraser stores that would continue to be operated by House of Fraser. The Company added to its private-label brands in 2000 with House of Fraser womenswear, The Collection menswear, and a Linea Home.

In 2003, Tom Hunter put forward a hostile bid for the Group, with the possible intention to merge with Allders, another department store in which he had shareholdings. In addition, there was a large reduction in the number of House of Fraser stores in Scotland which included the sell off or closure of branches in Aberdeen (Frasers), Dundee (Arnotts), Inverness (Frasers), Paisley (Arnotts) and Perth (Frasers).

In 2005, the House of Fraser acquired the four Jenners department stores in April for £46m, and Beatties, a mainly Midlands based department store chain of 12 sites, for £69.3m in the summer of 2005. In addition to buying companies, House of Fraser continued its own development programme and opened several more stores including its first store outside the UK (since the disposal of the Switzer business in Ireland in 1991) in Dundrum Town Centre, Dublin, Ireland. as well as stores in Maidstone and Norwich.

In 2006, the Company consolidated its portfolio by closing the 135-year-old Barkers business in Kensington High Street on 2 January 2006. and on 14 January 2006, closed its Dickins & Jones store in London's Regent Street following a substantial rent increase. In addition, the Company closed its Birmingham Beatties store in January 2006 (although retained the House of Fraser store in Birmingham).

2006–2014: Highland Group Holdings

In February 2006, the Group announced that it had received a preliminary bid approach valuing it at £300 million and, in August 2006, the House of Fraser confirmed a takeover approach from the Highland consortium who acquired the company for £351.4 million in November 2006. Highland Group Holdings Limited was 35% owned by Landsbanki. As part of the Highland takeover all brand names for their stores, including most of the Beatties branches, will be replaced with the House of Fraser name (with the exception of Jenners) with the stag logo axed and a new sans-serif typeface used on shop signs.

In September 2007, House of Fraser launched its online store.

The company had four major openings in 2008, including its first store in Northern Ireland in the newly built Victoria Square Shopping Centre, Belfast in March. At  it was the largest store that House of Fraser had opened (as opposed to taken over) in the UK. Also in March 2008, the Company opened a  store in High Wycombe. On 25 September 2008 the Company opened a  store in the Cabot Circus development in Bristol, and a branch in Westfield London, a new  store, on 30 October 2008.

House of Fraser launched the HouseofFraser.com "Buy & Collect" concept shop in October 2011 with its first location in Aberdeen. A further site, in Liverpool, opened in 2012. These small shops were equipped with computer terminals to allow customers to order from the House of Fraser website. Both shops had closed by the summer of 2016.

In December 2013, talks to takeover House of Fraser were held by French department store Galeries Lafayette with House of Fraser also exploring a floating on the London Stock Exchange once more in the summer of 2014 if the takeover was to be abandoned.

2014–2018: Sanpower Group ownership
In April 2014, it was reported by BBC News that House of Fraser would be sold to Chinese conglomerate Sanpower Group, who would obtain 89% share in the company which would value the business at about £450 million. Nanjing Xinjiekou Department Store Co will buy an 89% stake in Highland Group Holdings Ltd, which owns House of Fraser. The purchase was worth £450 million. Sanpower Group is a 22 percent shareholder of the Nanjing Xinjiekou Department Store Co. On 2 September 2014. Don McCarthy, retiring Executive Chairman of House of Fraser, announced the completion of the sale of 100% of the preferred ordinary shares and B ordinary shares, and approximately 89% of the A ordinary shares and preference shares of Highland Group Holdings Ltd, to Nanjing Xinjiekou Department Store Co, a leading chain of Chinese department stores and part of the Sanpower Group, for an enterprise value of approximately £480 million.

In 2017, a new department store opened at the Rushden Lakes development in Rushden, Northamptonshire. The closure of House of Fraser Outlet in Leicester also took place during the year and a further closure, in Aylesbury, was announced for 2018, however, this never materialised following the acquisition by Sports Direct International. A new store in Chester was announced in February 2017 with construction due to start in mid-2018. It was announced later in 2018 that House of Fraser had pulled out of these plans due to their financial issues.

2018: Administration
On 2 May 2018, the company announced that it was to be entering into a conditional sale of a controlling stake in the firm to Nanjing Cenbest (another Sanpower Group subsidiary) to Hamleys owner C.banner, another Chinese firm. A condition of the sale that the company streamline its existing store portfolio and cost base was set out. The intention to launch a company voluntary arrangement (CVA) was announced on the same day. However, C.banner later pulled out.

On 7 June 2018, the company announced that it would close 31 of its 58 UK stores:

Altrincham • Aylesbury • Birkenhead • Birmingham • Bournemouth • Camberley • Cardiff • Carlisle • Chichester • Cirencester • Cwmbran • Darlington • Doncaster • Edinburgh Frasers • Epsom • Grimsby • High Wycombe • Hull • Leamington Spa • Lincoln • London Oxford Street • London King William Street • Middlesbrough • Milton Keynes • Plymouth • Shrewsbury • Skipton • Swindon • Telford • Wolverhampton • Worcester

This included the flagship Oxford Street branch and the largest store, Birmingham, to be closed by January 2019. Richard Lim of Retail Economics said that it remained "hard to know with any certainty just what will happen next at House of Fraser" but that without any external funding within a matter of weeks it would inevitably fall into administration. Before the intended closures the company employed 6,000 people directly, with another 11,500 employed through concessions. The subsequent administration of the business meant the CVA and associated plans for restructuring (including the previously announced store closures) came to an abrupt end.

2018–present: Sports Direct and Frasers Group PLC
On 10 August 2018, House of Fraser entered administration. Later that day, Sports Direct (now Frasers Group) agreed to buy the assets of the business – the House of Fraser stores, brand and the stock – for £90 million in cash on a pre-packaged insolvency basis. Soon after the acquisition, many store closures were announced including the previously safe Manchester store, as well as Nottingham, Lakeside, Gateshead and Norwich, among others. However, after months of negotiations, almost all stores were saved, with the exception of the branch in Shrewsbury, Cirencester, Edinburgh Frasers, Chichester and London King William Street, all of which closed during December 2018 and January 2019.

In October 2018, Frasers Group plc purchased the Frasers building in Glasgow for £95 million and pledged to restore the building to its former condition.

On 14 June 2019, it was confirmed that the store in Hull, which nearly closed in December, would close in Summer 2019 as a result of failing to agree on redevelopments to the site.

On 26 July 2019, it was reported that Sports Direct had received a £605 million bill from the Belgian tax authorities. The retailer rebutted the claims and the matter was resolved in January 2020. Sports Direct described the problems at House of Fraser as "nothing short of terminal". The cost of keeping the group running had been £51 million at that time. Its owner said there would be further store closures and added that there were a number of stores that, despite paying no rent, were still unprofitable. Sports Direct's CEO, Mike Ashley, attributed the collapse of House of Fraser to the "incompetence of previous management".

In the Frasers Group plc interim results in December 2019, the group noted it was starting to see signs of recovery as it continued to integrate the business into the Group and bring new disciplines, experience, and skills to bear which were helping the turnaround. The group also noted that the Frasers strategy is to create a superior shopping experience for the consumer which will be led by the original Frasers in Glasgow.

On 29 September 2021, the company stated that of the original 59 stores House of Fraser operated at the time of administration, 43 were still open. In November 2021, it was announced that House of Fraser  had been given notice of eviction at their Oxford Street store by the landlord, who were going to redevelop the building into a mix of office, retail and leisure. The store would close in January 2022, which along with other store closures would see the chain drop to 41 stores.

Current branches

All stores trade as House of Fraser unless otherwise stated (November 2022):
 Aylesbury (formerly Beatties; acquired 2005)
 Balloch, Loch Lomond Shores, Jenners (acquired 2005)
 Bath, Jollys (acquired 1971)
 Belfast, Frasers (formerly House of Fraser; opened 2008)
 Birmingham (formerly Rackhams; acquired 1959)
 Bluewater (opened 1999)
 Bristol (opened 2008)
 Camberley (formerly Army & Navy, and originally William Harvey; acquired 1973)
 Cardiff (formerly Howells / James Howell & Co.; acquired 1972)
 Carlisle (formerly Binns, and originally Robinson Brothers; acquired 1953)
 Cheltenham, Cavendish House (acquired 1969)
 Cork, Frasers (opened 2022)
 Croydon (opened 2004)
 Darlington, Binns (formerly Arthur Sanders; acquired 1953)
 Derry / Londonderry, Frasers (opened 2021)
 Epsom (formerly Dickins & Jones and originally Army & Navy; opened 1984)
 Glasgow, Frasers (formerly McDonalds, Wylie & Lochhead and originally the separate stores of McDonalds and Wylie & Lochhead; acquired 1951 and 1957 respectively)
 Guildford (formerly Army & Navy, and originally William Harvey; acquired 1973)
 Leeds (formerly Rackhams, prior to that the temporary premises of Schofields, and originally the Leeds branch of Woolworths; acquired 1988) due to close
 Lincoln (formerly Binns, and originally Mawer & Collingham; acquired 1980)
 Maidstone (opened 2005)
 Manchester (formerly Kendals / Kendal Milne & Co.; acquired 1959)
 Norwich (opened 2005)
 Nottingham (opened 1997)
 Plymouth (formerly Dingles / E Dingle & Co.; acquired 1971)
 Reading (opened 1999)
 Rushden, Rushden Lakes, Frasers (formerly House of Fraser; opened 2017)
 Solihull (formerly Beatties; acquired 2005)
 Sutton Coldfield (formerly Beatties; acquired 2005)
 Telford (formerly Beatties; acquired 2005)
 West Thurrock, Lakeside (opened 1991)
 White City, Westfield London (opened 2008) closing down
 Wolverhampton, Frasers (opened 2021 in premises previously occupied by Debenhams)
 Worcester (formerly Beatties; acquired 2005)
Outlet/clearance stores:

 Doncaster, House of Fraser Outlet (formerly Binns, prior to that Owen Owen and originally Verity & Sons; acquired 1976)

Frasers 
It was reported in the press in May 2019 that Mike Ashley planned to open a new group of department stores under the Frasers nameplate. This group would have been positioned at the luxury end of the market with a focus on brands, experiences, and services. The project was led by Michael Murray, the group's Head of Elevation. The original Frasers store in Glasgow was planned to become the flagship of the group with a number of existing House of Fraser stores converted to the Frasers format. It was announced that House of Fraser Meadowhall and House of Fraser Belfast would each receive significant investment to become Frasers stores. New Frasers stores would have opened in Liverpool and Wolverhampton. The Wolverhampton opening was announced on 3 October 2019, a new 94,000 sq ft store in premises due to be vacated by Debenhams. The closure of House of Fraser's 376,000 sq ft Beatties store in the city was confirmed at the same time.

Future closures
House of Fraser stores in Lincoln and White City are scheduled for permanent closure (as of April 2021). In addition to the confirmed closures many of House of Fraser's landlords are currently exploring alternative uses for sites occupied by the group. These include department stores in Bath (Jollys), Birmingham, Cardiff, Edinburgh (Jenners), Guildford, High Wycombe, London (Oxford Street), Manchester, Middlesbrough, Plymouth and Reading.

Former brands and branches

Former regional groups
House of Fraser previously traded under many different, long established brand names. A number of regional groups of stores were acquired and subsequently extended or amalgamated. The Arnotts and Frasers groups were created by House of Fraser from scratch. These key groups, together with the flagship store of each one, and the regions to which they are largely associated are:

 Army & Navy, Victoria Street, London and south-east England
 Arnotts, mid-market stores in Glasgow and across Scotland
 Beatties, Wolverhampton, stores based in the Midlands.
 Binns, Sunderland, the north and east of England
 Dickins & Jones, Regent Street, London and the home counties
 Dingles, Plymouth and south-west England
 David Evans, Swansea and south Wales
 Frasers, up-market stores in Glasgow, Edinburgh and other principal Scottish cities
 Rackhams, Birmingham, the Midlands and the north of England.

Former non department store businesses
House of Fraser owned several other retail businesses that were not department stores. In 1941, Fraser's purchased the furniture retailer Muir Simpson of Sauchiehall Street, Glasgow, while J & A Ogilvie Ltd was added in 1966 after the purchase of Wylie and Lochhead. Another business that was gained by purchasing Wylie and Lochhead was funeral directors, which were grown by further purchases. The company also owned clothing manufacturers Nithco Manufacturing, Arthur & Co, and John Kirsop & Son. They also operated clothing stores including: 
Carswell (The Modern Man's Shop) 
Cochranes Stores 
McLaren & Son 
Forresters 
Kings Fashions 
Logie & Co.
Maryon Fashion Group (after purchase of J J Allen)
Chanelle(after purchase of J J Allen)

In the 1980s it created the brand YOU jewellery & cosmetic stores, purchased the shoe retailer Kurt Geiger, tailors Turnbull & Asser, Hawes & Curtis and James Drew, in addition to growing its sports chain Astral Sports which it had purchased in 1978.

Former branches
Over the years, the following department stores have closed and no longer trade as part of the company.

 Aberdeen, Arnotts (formerly Isaac Benzie) 
 Aberdeen, Frasers (formerly Falconers / John Falconer; closed 2002)
 Aberdeen, A & R Milne
 Aberdeen, Reid & Pearson
 Aberdeen, R J Smith
 Aberdeen, Watt & Grant
 Aldershot, Army & Navy (formerly Thomas White)
 Altrincham, Rackhams (formerly Brown Muff; opened 1978; closed 31 August 2020)
 Arbroath, Arnotts (formerly Soutars)
 Aviemore, Arnotts
 Basildon, Army & Navy (formerly Taylors)
 Bath, Cavendish House (amalgamated with Jolly & Son)
Belfast, Robertson Ledlie Ferguson & Co.
 Bingley, Brown Muff (formerly Pratts)
 Birkenhead, House of Fraser  (formerly Beatties, and originally Allansons; acquired 2005; closed 25 March 2020)
 Birmingham, Beatties (formerly the Birmingham branch of C & A; closed 2006)
 Blackpool, Binns (formerly R H O Hills)
 Bournemouth, J J Allen
 Bournemouth, House of Fraser (formerly Dingles, and originally Brights; acquired 1969) closed 2022
 Bradford, Rackhams (formerly Brown Muff / Brown, Muff & Co.; closed 1995)
 Bridlington, Binns (formerly Hammonds, and originally Carltons; closed 1995)
 Brigg, Binns (formerly Lacey & Clark)
 Bristol, Dingles (formerly Brights, prior to that the Bristol branch of Bobby & Co., and originally John Cordeux & Sons)
 Bristol, House of Fraser (formerly Bentalls, prior to that John Lewis, and originally the Bristol branch of Lewis's; closed 2008; relocated to Cabot Circus in the same year)   
 Bristol, Jollys
 Bromley, Army & Navy (formerly Harrison Gibson; closed 2004)
 Burton upon Trent, Beatties (acquired 2005, closed 29 September 2012) 
 Cardiff, Seccombes
 Chichester, House of Fraser (formerly Army & Navy, and originally J D Morant; acquired 1973; closed 26 January 2019)
 Cirencester, House of Fraser (formerly Rackhams, and originally Frederick Boulton; acquired 1975; closed 5 January 2019)
 Coatbridge, Arnotts (formerly Bairds)
 Crouch End, James H Wilson
 Cwmbran House of Fraser (formerly David Evans; acquired 1977, closed 29 June 2022)
 Dingwall, Arnotts (formerly Benzies)
 Doncaster, Brown Muff
 Doncaster, House of Fraser Outlet (formerly Binns, previously Owen Owen, originally Verity & Sons)
 Dorchester, Dingles (formerly Army & Navy, and originally Genge & Co.)
 Drumchapel, Arnotts (formerly Bairds)
 Dudley, Beatties (closed 2010)
 Dumfries, Binns (formerly Robinson Brothers and originally William Munro; closed 1990)
 Dundee, Arnotts (formerly D M Brown; closed 2002)
 Dundee, Alexander Ewing & Co.
 Dundrum, House of Fraser (opened 2005; closed 2020)
 Eastbourne, Army & Navy (formerly Barkers, and originally Dale & Kerley; closed 1997)
 East Kilbride, Arnotts (formerly Bairds)
 Edinburgh, Peter Allan
 Edinburgh, Arnotts (formerly J & R Allan)
 Edinburgh, Arnotts (formerly Patrick Thomson)
 Edinburgh, J D Blair & Son
 Edinburgh, Frasers (formerly Binns, and originally Robert Maule & Son; acquired 1953; closed 10 November 2018)
 Edinburgh, Jenners acquired 2005, closed 2021
 Edinburgh, William Small & Sons
 Elgin, Arnotts (formerly Benzie & Miller, and originally A L Ramsay & Son)
 Epsom, Army & Navy (formerly Chiesmans, and originally Reids / H L Reid & Co.; acquired 1975; closed 1984)
 Evesham, Rackhams (formerly Rightons) 
 Exeter, House of Fraser (formerly Dingles, and originally Colsons; acquired 1969; closed 2 November 2019)
 Falkirk, Arnotts (formerly Bairds)
 Falmouth, Dingles (formerly Cox & Horder)
 Fraserburgh, Benzie & Miller (acquired 1958; closed 1968)
 Gateshead, MetroCentre, House of Fraser (opened 1986, closed September 2021)
 Glasgow, Arnotts (formerly Arnott Simpson, and originally Arnott & Co. and Robert Simpson & Sons)
 Glasgow, Copland & Lye
 Glasgow, Dallas's
 Glasgow, Dalys
 Glasgow, Duncans
 Glasgow, Fraser, Sons & Co. (closed 1975; business transferred to McDonald's Wylie & Lochhead store opposite)
 Glasgow, Pettigrew & Stephens
 Glasgow, Arnotts (formerly Thomas Muirhead)
 Glasgow, Wood & Selby
 Gravesend, Army & Navy (formerly Chiesmans and originally Bon Marche)
 Greenock, Arnotts (formerly Shannons / J & S Shannon)
 Greenock, Prentices / D & A Prentice 
 Grimsby, House of Fraser (formerly Binns, and originally Guy & Smith; acquired 1969; closed 2020)
 Harrogate, Binns (formerly McDonalds and originally Edward J Clarke)
 Harrogate, Schofields (formerly Cresta House, and originally the Harrogate branch of Marshall & Snelgrove)
 Helston, Dingles (formerly B Thomas)
 High Wycombe (opened 13th March 2008) closed 12th January 2023
 Hove, Army & Navy (formerly Chiesmans, prior to that Stuart Norris and originally Driscolls)
 Huddersfield House of Fraser (formerly Beatties; acquired 2005, closed 29 August 2022)
 Hull, House of Fraser (formerly Hammonds; acquired 1972; closed 4 August 2019)
 Ilford, Army & Navy (formerly Chiesmans and originally Burnes)
 Inverness, Arnotts (formerly Benzie & Miller, and originally Young & Chapman; acquired 1958; closed 2003)
 Islington, T R Roberts
 Kensington, Barkers / John Barker & Co. (acquired 1957; closed 2006)
 Kensington, Derry & Toms (acquired 1957; closed 1973)
 Kensington, Pontings (acquired 1957; closed 1970)
 Kilmarnock, Arnotts (formerly Frasers and originally Hugh Lauder & Co.)
 Kingston upon Thames, Army & Navy (formerly Chiesmans, Hide & Co., and originally Shrubsoles)
 Kirkcaldy, Arnotts (formerly Sutters)
 Leeds, Schofields (closed 1996)
 Leicester, Hotel Street and Market Street, Rackhams (formerly Morgan Squire, acquired 1969; closed 1990)
 Leicester, Highcross / The Shires, House of Fraser Outlet (formerly Rackhams, opened 1991; closed 2017)
 Lewisham, Army & Navy (formerly Chiesmans)
 Liverpool, Binns (formerly Hendersons / William Henderson & Sons)
 Liverpool, House of Fraser.com (opened 2011; closed 2013)
 London, King William Street, House of Fraser (opened 2003; closed 29 December 2018)
 Oxford Street, London, House of Fraser (formerly D H Evans; acquired 1959)
 London, Regent Street, Dickins & Jones (acquired 1959; closed 2006)
 Maidstone, Army & Navy (formerly T C Dunning & Son; closed 2005)
 Maidstone, Chiesmans (formerly Denniss Paine)
 Milton Keynes, House of Fraser (formerly Dickins & Jones; opened 1981; closed 1 February 2020)
 Middlesbrough, House of Fraser (formerly Binns and originally Thomas Jones; acquired 1953; closed 2022)
 Motherwell, Arnotts (formerly Bairds)
 Newcastle upon Tyne, Binns (formerly James Coxon; closed 1994)
 Newport, Isle of Wight, Army & Navy (formerly Chiesmans, and originally Morris / Edward Morris)
 Newquay, Dingles (formerly Hawke & Thomas)
 Newton Abbot, Dingles (formerly William Badcock & Son)
 Newton Abbot, J F Rockhey
 Newton Abbot, Henry Warren & Son
 Northampton, House of Fraser (formerly Beatties; acquired 2005; closed 2014)
 Oswestry, Rackhams (formerly Bradleys)
 Oxford, Webbers
 Paisley, Arnotts (formerly Robert Cochran & Son; closed 2003)
 Paisley, Fraser & Love
 Penzance, Dingles (formerly John Polglase)
 Perth, Frasers (opened 1984; closed 2002; purchased by Debenhams)
 Perth, Gordon & Stanfield
 Perth, D A Wallace & Co.
 Peterhead, Arnotts (previously Benzie & Miller and originally Simpson & Barclay; destroyed by fire in 1977 and not reopened)
 Port Glasgow, Bairds
 Port Talbot, David Evans (formerly W J Williams)
 Portsmouth, Army & Navy (formerly John Anstiss)
 Richmond, House of Fraser (formerly Dickins & Jones, opened 1970 on site of Gosling & Sons, acquired 1957; closed September 2020)
Richmond, Wright Brothers, sold to Owen Owen in 1976 as part of a swap which saw House of Fraser acquire Owen Owen's Doncaster store 
 Rochester, Army & Navy (formerly Chiesmans, and originally Leonards)
 Leamington Spa, House of Fraser (formerly Rackhams, prior to that Army & Navy, and originally Burgis & Colbourne; acquired 1973)
 St Albans, Army & Navy (formerly W S Green)
 Salisbury, Dingles (formerly Clark & Lonnen)
 Scunthorpe, Binns (opened 1974; closed 1997)
 Sheffield, House of Fraser (formerly Rackhams, and originally Walshs / John Walsh; acquired 1959; closed 1998)
 Sheffield, Meadowhall, House of Fraser (opened 1990; closed 2021)
 Shotts, Arnotts (formerly Bairds)
 Shrewsbury, Grocott & Co.(amalgamated with Joseph Della Porta) 
 Shrewsbury, House of Fraser (formerly Rackhams, and originally Joseph Della Porta; acquired 1975; closed 12 January 2019)
 Skipton, Rackhams (formerly Brown Muff, and originally Amblers; acquired 1977, closed 6 December 2019)
 Southend-on-Sea, Army & Navy (formerly Chiesmans, and prior to that the Southend branch of J R Roberts Stores (as part of Hide & Co))
 Southport, Binns (formerly Alexanders)
 South Shields, Binns (formerly Fowler & Brock; acquired 1953; closed 1995)
 Sunderland, Binns (acquired 1953; closed 1993)
 Swansea, David Evans (acquired 1977; closed 2005)
 Swindon, House of Fraser Outlet (formerly House of Fraser; opened 1996; closed November 2021)
 Torquay, Dingles (formerly J F Rockhey)
 Trowbridge, Dingles (formerly Fear Hill)
 Truro, Dingles (formerly Criddle & Smith)
 Tunbridge Wells, Army & Navy (formerly Chiesmans and originally Waymarks)
 Upton Park, Army & Navy (formerly Chiesmans, prior to that The John Lewis Store of Upton Park and originally a branch of  John Lewis & Co. of Oxford Street)
 Victoria Street, London, House of Fraser (formerly Army & Navy / Army & Navy Stores; acquired 1973, closed July 2022)
 Wells, Dingles (formerly Fear Hill, and originally J N Button)
 West Hartlepool, Binns (formerly Gray Peverell; closed 1992)
 Whifflet, Arnotts (formerly Bairds)
 Wishaw, Arnotts (formerly Bairds / T Baird & Sons)
 Wolverhampton, Beatties (acquired 2005; closed 2020)
 Wolverhampton, Rackhams (formerly Army & Navy, and originally Thomas Clarkson & Sons)
 Wood Green, Army & Navy (formerly Chiesmans and originally A Barton & Co.)
 Wood Green, D H Evans
 Yeovil, Dingles (formerly Gamis's)

The following department stores were demerged or sold as going concerns:

 Airdrie, Bairds -sold in 1989 to a management buyout led by Murdoch McMaster. (formerly Arnotts previously Bairds)
Ayr, David Hourston & Sons (traded as Arnotts prior to sale) sold in 1989 to a management buyout led by Murdoch McMaster.
 Banff, Sold to a management team led by Murdoch McMaster in 1989. (formerly Arnotts, previously Benzie & Miller, and originally Rankin & Co.)
 Bellshill originally Bairds, became Arnotts, before being bought out in 1989 by the management team led by Murdoch McMaster.
Copenhagen, A C Illum
Cork, Cashs (now Brown Thomas)
Cork, Robertson Ledlie Ferguson & Co. Sold 1979.
Dublin, Switzer & Co. Purchased by Brown Thomas in 1995. Refurbished and opened as Brown Thomas.
Galway, Moons (now Brown Thomas)
Hamilton, Bairds (traded as Arnotts prior to sale) sold 1989 in management buyout led by Murdoch McMaster.
 Irvine, formerly Arnotts, sold as part of management buyout led by Murdoch McMaster in 1989. 
Knightsbridge, London, Harrods
Limerick, Todds (now Brown Thomas)
Stirling, McLachlan & Brown (traded as Frasers prior to sale)
Waterford, Robertson Ledlie Ferguson & Co.

See also
Debenhams, John Lewis, Arcadia Group, Marks & Spencer, Next plc - contemporary UK competitors

References

External links
 
House of Fraser archive project, University of Glasgow
House of Fraser Archive

 
Department stores of the United Kingdom
Scottish brands
Companies based in Derbyshire
Companies based in Glasgow
Clothing retailers of Scotland
Clothing companies of Scotland
Retail companies established in 1849
1849 establishments in Scotland
British Royal Warrant holders
History of Glasgow
Sports Direct
Companies that have entered administration in the United Kingdom